Thomas Rhys Morgan (born Tom Rees Morgan; 11 April 1893 – 6 April 1975) was a Welsh cricketer. A right-handed batsman, he played 39 first-class matches for Glamorgan between 1921 and 1925. For Glamorgan, he made 1,044 runs with a highest score of 87*.

Morgan was born Tom Rees Morgan in Porth on 11 April 1893. He was registered as Thomas Rhys Morgan at death, which occurred on 6 April 1975 in Aberkenfig.

References

External links

1893 births
1975 deaths
Welsh cricketers
Glamorgan cricketers